The  was an event which occurred in northern Korea on 4 June 1937 (Juche 26), when Korean and Chinese guerrillas commanded by Kim Il-sung (or possibly Choe Hyon) attacked and defeated a Japanese detachment during the anti-Japanese armed struggle in Korea. The battle holds an important place in North Korean narratives of history.

Battle 

According to the Korean Friendship Association, the battle was in retaliation to the brutality of the Japanese occupation of Korea at a time when "the Japanese imperialists perpetrated unheard-of fascist tyranny against the Korean people".

According to the official North Korean version of the events, a small unit of about 150–200 guerrillas of the Northeast Anti-Japanese United Army's Sixth Division under Kim Il-sung crossed the Amnok River and arrived at the Konjang Hill on 3 June 1937. At 22:00, Kim Il-sung fired a shot into the sky, and the battle started. During the battle, the Japanese-occupied police station, post office, foresters' office, local elementary school, fire department hall were destroyed by the guerrillas. Kim took 4,000 yen from local people and inflicted damage estimated at 16,000 yen. He took the town but only occupied it for a few hours or a day before retreating to Manchuria.

Following combat, Kim Il-sung made a speech, where he noted that the Korean people "turn out as one in the sacred anti-Japanese war". The battle is featured in Kim Il-sung's autobiography With the Century. In it, too, Kim describes his guerrilla troops acting spontaneously and motivated by emotion rather than reason and strategic insights. In it, he said of the event:

This official version of the battle does not correspond with some contemporary records such as a Japanese newspaper, however, which suggest that the rebels were actually led by Choe Hyon.

Aftermath and legacy 
 
The news of the battle was reported in numerous newspapers across the world, including the Soviet Union, China, Japan and France. According to the Association for the Study of Songun Politics UK, a pro-North Korean Juche study group:

The event brought Kim some fame among both his comrades as well as the Japanese. As a result, his influence grew, though the Japanese Imperial Army also started to hunt him, and almost wiped out his force. He was eventually forced retreat into the Soviet Union in 1940. Northern Korea was officially liberated from Japan on V-J Day (15 August 1945). Kim subsequently returned to his home country, and when he managed to establish himself with Soviet help as head of People's Committee of North Korea and Party's north faction (predecessors of future North Korea and WPK, respectively), his reputation as hero of Pochonbo helped him to gain acceptance and support among the people.

Since then, the North Korean government has continuously reinforced the importance of the Battle of Pochonbo and Kim Il-sung's role in it. As result, it was speculated that Kim Jong-un, Kim Il-sung's grandson, had purged Choe Hyon's son Choe Ryong-hae in 2014 to prevent the undermining of the official version of the battle. It later became clear, however, that Choe Ryong-hae had not been purged at all and remained an influential member of the North Korean government.

The battle first entered the history textbook of South Korea in 2003, account Kim Il Sung's efforts on Anti-Japanese in relatively circumspect narratives. Controversies were raised on whether it makes students idolize North Korean regimes, or it could become a sign of South Korean history education stepping out from the cold-war thinking.

The Pochonbo Electronic Ensemble takes its name from the battle.

Battle site 
The battle site is situated at Pochon County, Ryanggang Province at the Kusi Barrage on Kojang Hill.

See also 

Korean independence movement
Mt. Paektu (poem)
Pochonbo Electronic Ensemble
Pochonbo Torch Prize

References

Works cited

External links 
 

Anti-Japanese sentiment in North Korea
Pochonbo
1937 in Asia
History of Ryanggang Province
Korea under Japanese rule
Kim Il-sung